Kacper Tatara (born 20 March 1988 in Lublin) is a Polish footballer who plays as a forward for Dolcan Ząbki.

He previously played for Polish Orange Ekstraklasa side Cracovia and the German 3. Liga side SV Darmstadt 98.

References

1988 births
Living people
MKS Cracovia (football) players
Polish footballers
Polish expatriate sportspeople in Germany
Sportspeople from Lublin
Expatriate footballers in Germany
Znicz Pruszków players
Chojniczanka Chojnice players
SV Darmstadt 98 players
Ząbkovia Ząbki players
3. Liga players

Association football forwards
Stal Rzeszów players